Malaysia first competed at the Deaflympics for the first time in 1993. Since then, Malaysia has competed at the Summer Deaflympics on four occasions (2001, 2005, 2009 & 2017). Malaysia won its first Deaflympic medal also during its maiden appearance at the 1993 Summer Deaflympics. Malaysia also narrowly missed the opportunity to compete at the 2013 Summer Deaflympics after being not readied to take part at the event.

Prior to the  2017 Summer Deaflympics, Malaysian government announced that the medallists at the Summer Deaflympics would be rewarded.

Malaysia have never competed at the Winter Deaflympics.

Medal tallies

Summer Deaflympics

Medals by Summer Sport

List of medalist

Summer Deaflympics

See also
 Malaysia at the Paralympics

References